Miķelis Rēdlihs (born July 1, 1984) is a Latvian professional ice hockey forward, currently playing for HK Olimp of Latvian Hockey League (LAT). He has played for Latvian national team in the 2005, 2006, 2007, 2008, 2009, 2010 and 2011 World Championships. Two of Miķelis Rēdlihs' brothers also are hockey players - Jēkabs Rēdlihs and Krišjānis Rēdlihs.

Career statistics

Regular season and playoffs

International

References

External links

1984 births
Living people
Dinamo Riga players
Ice hockey players at the 2006 Winter Olympics
Ice hockey players at the 2010 Winter Olympics
Ice hockey players at the 2014 Winter Olympics
IF Björklöven players
Latvian ice hockey right wingers
Lokomotiv Yaroslavl players
Metallurg Zhlobin players
Olympic ice hockey players of Latvia
Ice hockey people from Riga
Yunost Minsk players
Latvian expatriate sportspeople in the United States
Latvian expatriate sportspeople in Belarus
Latvian expatriate sportspeople in Sweden
Latvian expatriate sportspeople in Russia
Expatriate ice hockey players in the United States
Expatriate ice hockey players in Russia
Expatriate ice hockey players in Sweden
Expatriate ice hockey players in Belarus
HK Riga 2000 players
Latvian expatriate ice hockey people